The 2021–22 Primeira Liga (also known as Liga Portugal Bwin for sponsorship reasons) was the 88th season of the Primeira Liga, the top professional league for Portuguese association football clubs, and the first season under the current Liga Portugal title. This was the fifth Primeira Liga season to use video assistant referee (VAR). The start and end dates for the season were released on 21 May 2021, and the fixtures were released on 8 July 2021.

Sporting CP were the defending champions, having won their nineteenth Primeira Liga and their first title since the 2001–02 season at the previous season. Estoril, Vizela and Arouca joined as the promoted clubs from the 2020–21 Liga Portugal 2. They replaced Farense, Nacional and Rio Ave, which were relegated to Liga Portugal 2 the previous season.

This season saw the return of full capacity crowds, after the final third of the 2019–20 and the entirety of the 2020–21 seasons were held with limited or no attendance due to the restrictions caused by the COVID-19 pandemic in Portugal.

Porto secured their 30th league title with one match remaining, following a 1–0 away victory over rivals Benfica on 7 May 2022.

Teams
Eighteen teams compete in the league – the top fifteen teams from the previous season and three teams promoted from the LigaPro: Estoril, Vizela and Arouca.

Changes
Estoril (promoted after a three-year absence) and Vizela (promoted after a 36-year absence) were promoted from the 2020–21 Liga Portugal 2 (finishing 1st and 2nd places), replacing Farense and Nacional (both relegated after only one year in the top flight).

Arouca (promoted after a four-year absence) was promoted after finishing in 3rd place in 2020–21 Liga Portugal 2 and winning the Promotion play-offs against Rio Ave (relegated after thirteen years in the top flight).

Stadia and locations

Personnel and sponsors

Managerial changes

League table

Relegation play-offs
The relegation play-offs took place on 21 and 29 May 2022 between Moreirense who finished 16th in the Primeira Liga and Chaves who finished 3rd in Liga Portugal 2.

All times are WEST (UTC+1).

|}

Chaves won 2–1 on aggregate and were promoted to 2022–23 Primeira Liga; Moreirense were relegated to 2022–23 Liga Portugal 2.

Results

Statistics

Top goalscorers

Hat-tricks

Notes
(H) – Home team(A) – Away team

Top assists

Clean sheets

Discipline

Player 
 Most yellow cards: 13
 Lucas Possignolo (Portimonense)
 Most red cards: 3
 Alfa Semedo (Vitória de Guimarães)

Club 
 Most yellow cards: 118
Vitória de Guimarães
 Most red cards: 11
Belenenses SAD

Awards

Monthly awards

Annual awards

Number of teams by district

Notes

References

Primeira Liga seasons
Portugal
1